Luis Marte or Luis Marté may refer to:
 Luis Marte (pitcher), American former baseball pitcher
 Luis Marté (infielder), American baseball infielder